Ichneutica disjungens is a moth of the family Noctuidae. This species is endemic to New Zealand and can be found on the central volcanic plateau of the North Island and in the eastern as well as the south western parts of the South Island. I. disjungens inhabits tussock grasslands in the alpine and subalpine zones. The hosts of the larvae of this species include Poa cita, P. colensoi, Festuca novae-zelandiae and Dracophyllum acerosum. The adults of this species are distinctive and are unlikely to be confused with other species. They are on the wing between October and March.

Taxonomy 
This species was first described by Francis Walker in 1858 using a male specimen collected by Percy Earl, likely in Waikouaiti, and named Heliophobus disjungens. The holotype specimen is held at the Natural History Museum, London. In 1868, thinking he was describing a new species, Achille Guenée named this species Hadena nervata. In 1887 Edward Meyrick synonymised that name and placed the species within the Mamestra genus. J. S. Dugdale discussed this species in his 1988 catalogue and placed it within the Graphania genus. In 2019 Robert Hoare undertook a major review of New Zealand Noctuidae. During this review the genus Ichneutica was greatly expanded and the genus Graphania was subsumed into that genus as a synonym. As a result of this review, this species is now known as Ichneutica disjungens.

Description 

Walker described the male of the species as follows:
I. disjungens is a distinctive and as such is unlikely to be confused with other species. The wingspan of the male of the species is between 34 and 38 mm, and for the female is between 35 and 39 mm.

Distribution 
This species is endemic to New Zealand. In the North Island, this species has only been found in the central volcanic plateau including the Tongariro National Park. In the South Island it is widespread. It is found in the eastern parts of the South Island as well as south western parts of that island including Fiordland.

Habitat 
This species inhabits tussock grasslands found in the alpine and subalpine zones.

Behaviour 
This species is on the wing between October and March. I. disjungens is regarded as a faster flying species and stays active despite increased wind velocities. The adults of this species are attracted to light.

Life history and host species 

Very little is known of the life history of this species. The host species of the larvae is recorded as being tussock grasses, meaning Poa cita, Poa colensoi and Festuca novae-zelandiae.  Dracophyllum acerosum is also listed as being a host. Adult moths have been observed feeding on the flowers of as well as pollinating Dracophyllum acerosum.

References 

Moths described in 1858
Moths of New Zealand
Hadeninae
Endemic fauna of New Zealand
Taxa named by Francis Walker (entomologist)
Endemic moths of New Zealand